Enosburg Falls is a village in the town of Enosburgh in Franklin County, Vermont, in the United States. The population was 1,356 at the 2020 census.

Geography
The village is located in the northwest corner of the town of Enosburgh along the Missisquoi River and its falls. The village center is north of the river, but the village limits extend south of the river as well. Vermont Routes 105 and 108 pass through the village together as Main Street. Route 105 leads northeast  to Richford and southwest  to St. Albans, the Franklin County seat. Route 108 leads north  to the West Berkshire Border Crossing at the Canada–United States border north of East Franklin and south  to Jeffersonville.

Demographics

As of the census of 2000, there were 1,473 people, 591 households, and 378 families residing in the village.  The population density was 414.0 people per square mile (159.8/km2).  There were 618 housing units at an average density of 173.7/sq mi (67.0/km2).  The racial makeup of the village was 96.81% White, 0.14% African American, 1.02% Native American, 0.20% Asian, 0.14% from other races, and 1.70% from two or more races. Hispanic or Latino of any race were 1.22% of the population. 36% reported French Canadian and French ancestry, 15% English, and 9% Irish.

There were 591 households, out of which 32.3% had children under the age of 18 living with them, 48.2% were married couples living together, 11.2% had a female householder with no husband present, and 36.0% were non-families. 30.6% of all households were made up of individuals, and 19.1% had someone living alone who was 65 years of age or older.  The average household size was 2.44 and the average family size was 3.03.

In the village, the population was spread out, with 26.7% under the age of 18, 7.1% from 18 to 24, 25.3% from 25 to 44, 20.9% from 45 to 64, and 20.0% who were 65 years of age or older.  The median age was 38 years. For every 100 females, there were 84.8 males.  For every 100 females age 18 and over, there were 81.8 males.

The median income for a household in the village was $30,221, and the median income for a family was $37,813. Males had a median income of $30,395 versus $20,542 for females. The per capita income for the village was $15,195.  About 8.0% of families and 12.2% of the population were below the poverty line, including 15.0% of those under age 18 and 16.9% of those age 65 or over.

Arts and Culture
Enosburg Falls is the home of the Vermont Dairy Festival.

Notable people 

 Juan Babauta, former Governor of the Northern Mariana Islands; lived for 3 years in Enosburg Falls with a host family, graduated from Enosburg Falls High School in 1972
Larry Gardner, third baseman with the Boston Red Sox, Philadelphia Athletics, and Cleveland Indians; born in Enosburg Falls (1886)
 Olin M. Jeffords, Chief Justice of the Vermont Supreme Court and father of Senator Jim Jeffords

Climate
This climatic region is typified by large seasonal temperature differences, with warm to hot (and often humid) summers and cold (sometimes severely cold) winters.  According to the Köppen Climate Classification system, Enosburg Falls has a humid continental climate, abbreviated "Dfb" on climate maps.

References

External links
Village of Enosburg Falls official website

Incorporated villages in Vermont
e
Burlington, Vermont metropolitan area
Villages in Franklin County, Vermont